Jiguaní is a town and municipality in the Granma Province of Cuba.

Overview
The municipality is divided into the barrios of Babiney, Baire, Bijagual, La Villa, Los Negros, Maffo, Rihito and Santa Rita.

The name "Jiguaní" is of Taíno origin, and means "height of the river". The town of Jiguaní was a stronghold and a starting point in the independence war of 1895.

Demographics
In 2004, the municipality of Jiguaní had a population of 60,320.

See also

Municipalities of Cuba
List of cities in Cuba

References

External links

Populated places in Granma Province